Clan Kelly is a Scottish clan. The clan does not have a chief recognised by the Lord Lyon King of Arms, therefore the clan has no standing under Scots Law. Clan Kelly is considered an armigerous clan, meaning that it is considered to have had at one time a chief who possessed the chiefly arms, however no one at present is in possession of such arms. The only evidence for clan Kelly is a reference to Kelly of that ilk by Alexander Nisbet, who blazoned the arms or, a saltire sable between four fleurs-de-lis azure.

The surname Kelly has multiple different origins, with the name originating in England, Ireland and Scotland. The clan name may be variant of Kelloe, a barony in the lands of Home in Berwickshire. There is also a Kelloe in Durham and another in Northumberland. An early Scottish bearer of the name was William de Kellaw, who was bailiff to Alexander III in 1278. Another was Richard de Kellow, who is recorded in 1338 as a witness to a charter in Roxburghshire. The name is also found in Fife and Angus in two place-names, for example Kellie Castle. In 1378, John de Kelly was Abbot at Arbroath. Another different group are the Mackellies of Galloway and Wigtownshire. These may likely be of "Celtic" descent.

See also
Kelly (surname), definitions of the various origins of the surname

References

Scottish clans
Armigerous clans